Goodeve may refer to:

People
Arthur Samuel Goodeve (1860–1920), Canadian pharmacist and politician
Charles F. Goodeve (1904–1980), Canadian chemist and pioneer in operations research
Florence Everilda Goodeve (1861–1915), English composer and lyricist
Grant Goodeve (born 1952), American actor and television host
Thyrza Nichols Goodeve, American writer, artist, and interviewer

Places

 Goodeve, Saskatchewan